East Newark is a borough in the western part of Hudson County, in the U.S. state of New Jersey. It is a suburb of Newark, which sits across the Passaic River. The borough is the second-smallest municipality by total area in the state.

The Borough of East Newark was established on July 2, 1895, from portions of Kearny lying between the Erie Railroad's Newark Branch right of way and Harrison, based on the results of a referendum held the previous day.

As of the 2020 United States census, the borough's population was 2,594, an increase of 188 (+7.8%) from the 2010 census count of 2,406, which in turn reflected an increase of 29 (+1.2%) from the 2,377 counted in the 2000 census.

Geography
According to the United States Census Bureau, the borough had a total area of 0.13 square miles (0.32 km2), including 0.10 square miles (0.27 km2) of land and 0.02 square miles (0.06 km2) of water (16.92%).

The borough is bordered to the north by Kearny and to the south and east by Harrison, both in Hudson County, and to the west by the Passaic River across from which is Newark in Essex County.

The Clark Thread Company Historic District is located in the borough.

Demographics

2010 census

The Census Bureau's 2006–2010 American Community Survey showed that (in 2010 inflation-adjusted dollars) median household income was $54,722 (with a margin of error of +/− $5,909) and the median family income was $59,423 (+/− $9,367). Males had a median income of $41,173 (+/− $3,762) versus $28,224 (+/− $4,249) for females. The per capita income for the borough was $22,242 (+/− $2,054). About 7.9% of families and 12.5% of the population were below the poverty line, including 15.3% of those under age 18 and 16.1% of those age 65 or over.

2000 census
As of the 2000 United States census, there were 2,377 people, 767 households, and 605 families residing in the borough. The population density was 23,330.0 people per square mile (9,177.6/km2). There were 799 housing units at an average density of 7,842.1 per square mile (3,085.0/km2). The racial makeup of the borough was 67.02% White, 1.68% African American, 0.50% Native American, 2.52% Asian, 0.04% Pacific Islander, 20.99% from other races, and 7.24% from two or more races. Hispanic or Latino of any race were 47.54% of the population.

As of the 2000 Census, 10.1% of East Newark's residents identified themselves as being of Peruvian American ancestry. This was the highest percentage of Peruvian American people in any place in the United States. In the same census, 6.2% of East Newark's residents identified themselves as being of Brazilian American ancestry, which was the highest percentage of Brazilian American people in any place in the United States. As of the 2000 Census, 7.67% of East Newark's residents identified themselves as being of Ecuadorian ancestry, which was the highest of any municipality in New Jersey and the third highest percentage of Ecuadorian people in any place in the United States with 1,000 or more residents identifying their ancestry.

There were 767 households, out of which 41.9% had children under the age of 18 living with them, 55.0% were married couples living together, 16.0% had a female householder with no husband present, and 21.1% were non-families. 16.0% of all households were made up of individuals, and 5.9% had someone living alone who was 65 years of age or older. The average household size was 3.10 and the average family size was 3.40.

In the borough the population was spread out, with 25.9% under the age of 18, 10.9% from 18 to 24, 36.7% from 25 to 44, 18.8% from 45 to 64, and 7.6% who were 65 years of age or older. The median age was 32 years. For every 100 females, there were 103.9 males. For every 100 females age 18 and over, there were 104.5 males.

The median income for a household in the borough was $44,352, and the median income for a family was $46,375. Males had a median income of $31,875 versus $24,231 for females. The per capita income for the borough was $16,415. About 11.3% of families and 12.6% of the population were below the poverty line, including 17.7% of those under age 18 and 8.6% of those age 65 or over.

Government

Local government

East Newark is governed under the Borough form of New Jersey municipal government, one of 218 municipalities (of the 564) statewide that use this form, the most commonly used form of government in the state. The governing body is comprised of the Mayor and the Borough Council, with all positions elected at-large on a partisan basis as part of the November general election. The Mayor is elected directly by the voters to a four-year term of office. The Borough Council is comprised of six members elected to serve three-year terms on a staggered basis, with two seats coming up for election each year in a three-year cycle. The Borough form of government used by East Newark is a "weak mayor / strong council" government in which council members act as the legislative body with the mayor presiding at meetings and voting only in the event of a tie. The mayor can veto ordinances subject to an override by a two-thirds majority vote of the council. The mayor makes committee and liaison assignments for council members, and most appointments are made by the mayor with the advice and consent of the council.

, the Mayor of East Newark is Democrat Dina M. Grilo, whose term of office ends December 31, 2023; Mayor Grilo is the first woman to serve as East Newark's mayor, having defeated Democratic-turned-Republican incumbent mayor Joseph Smith in the 2019 local election. Members of the East Newark Borough Council are Council President Jeanne Zincavage (D, 2023), Jessica Diaz (D, 2022), Rose M. Evaristo (D, 2024), Kenneth J. Graham (D, 2024), Hans Peter Lucas (D, 2023) and Christopher Reis (D, 2022).

Federal, state and county representation
East Newark is located in the 8th Congressional District and is part of New Jersey's 32nd state legislative district.

Politics
As of March 2011, there were a total of 753 registered voters in East Newark, of which 469 (62.3%) were registered as Democrats, 35 (4.6%) were registered as Republicans and 249 (33.1%) were registered as Unaffiliated. There were no voters registered to other parties.

In the 2012 presidential election, Democrat Barack Obama received 82.3% of the vote (400 cast), ahead of Republican Mitt Romney with 16.5% (80 votes), and other candidates with 1.2% (6 votes), among the 492 ballots cast by the borough's 844 registered voters (6 ballots were spoiled), for a turnout of 58.3%. In the 2008 presidential election, Democrat Barack Obama received 76.0% of the vote (414 cast), ahead of Republican John McCain with 22.6% (123 votes) and other candidates with 0.7% (4 votes), among the 545 ballots cast by the borough's 904 registered voters, for a turnout of 60.3%. In the 2004 presidential election, Democrat John Kerry received 71.2% of the vote (337 ballots cast), outpolling Republican George W. Bush with 26.4% (125 votes) and other candidates with 0.8% (6 votes), among the 473 ballots cast by the borough's 800 registered voters, for a turnout percentage of 59.1.

In the 2013 gubernatorial election, Democrat Barbara Buono received 64.9% of the vote (148 cast), ahead of Republican Chris Christie with 32.9% (75 votes), and other candidates with 2.2% (5 votes), among the 232 ballots cast by the borough's 884 registered voters (4 ballots were spoiled), for a turnout of 26.2%. In the 2009 gubernatorial election, Democrat Jon Corzine received 71.8% of the vote (234 ballots cast), ahead of Republican Chris Christie with 21.8% (71 votes) and Independent Chris Daggett with 4.0% (13 votes), among the 326 ballots cast by the borough's 765 registered voters, yielding a 42.6% turnout.

Education
The East Newark School District serves students in kindergarten through eighth grade at East Newark Public School. As of the 2018–19 school year, the district, comprised of one school, had an enrollment of 247 students and 15.9 classroom teachers (on an FTE basis), for a student–teacher ratio of 15.5:1.

For ninth through twelfth grades, public school students attend Harrison High School in Harrison, as part of a sending/receiving relationship with the Harrison Public Schools. Citing rising tuition costs, the district announced in 2013 that it was seeking to sever its relationship with Harrison and send its students to Kearny High School, where tuition costs for students would be substantially lower than the $14,674 per student paid to Harrison for the 2012–2013 school year. In 2015, the district agreed to a new six-year sending agreement with the Harrison district under which East Newark would pay $13,000 per student, rising by 2% annually, a drop from the $16,100 cost per student paid as of the 2014–2015 school year. As of the 2018–19 school year, the high school had an enrollment of 692 students and 54.0 classroom teachers (on an FTE basis), for a student–teacher ratio of 12.8:1.

Public safety
East Newark is protected by a volunteer fire department. There are approximately 34 firefighters who  staff one ladder and two engines, one of which is a spare. The department also has shared use of a haz-mat mass decontamination trailer unit with the Kearny and Harrison Fire Departments. The Fire Department has mutual aid agreements with all Hudson County departments and is also a member of the Southern Bergen County Mutual Aid Association.

East Newark has a police department with nine sworn officers, led by Chief Anthony Monteiro.

Transportation

Roads and highways

Interstate 280 passes through the southern portion of the borough. The entrances to interchange 16 lie in adjacent Harrison, and those for interchange 15B lie in Newark across the William A. Stickel Memorial Bridge over the Passaic River, which is crossed by the Clay Street Bridge.

Public transportation
NJ Transit bus service is available to Newark on the 30 and 76 routes.

The closest NJ Transit rail station to East Newark is the Newark Broad Street Station, with connections to the Montclair-Boonton Line and both branches of the Morris & Essex Lines.  The station is also served by the Newark Light Rail.  The closest rapid transit service is the PATH's Harrison station, a few blocks south of East Newark.

John F. Kennedy International Airport and LaGuardia Airport are in Queens, New York City.

Notable people

People who were born in, residents of, or otherwise closely associated with East Newark include:

 Davey Brown (1898–1970), professional soccer player inducted into the National Soccer Hall of Fame in 1951
 Jimmy Douglas (1898–1972), soccer goalkeeper who spent his career in the first American Soccer League
 Philip Kearny (1815–1862), United States Army officer, notable for his leadership in the Mexican–American War and American Civil War
 Cornelius Augustine McGlennon (1878–1931), represented  from 1919 to 1921 and was Mayor of East Newark, New Jersey from 1907 to 1919
 Erika Vogt (born 1973), sculptor, printmaker and video artist

References

External links

 Borough of East Newark Official Website
 East Newark Public School
 
 School Data for the East Newark Public School, National Center for Education Statistics

 
1895 establishments in New Jersey
Borough form of New Jersey government
Boroughs in Hudson County, New Jersey
Brazilian-American history
Populated places established in 1895